Demirköprü (literally iron bridge) is a railway bridge spanning the Seyhan River in Adana. Opened in 1912, it extends 530 meters between Reşatbey and Sinanpaşa neighborhoods. Demirköprü is a steel bridge constructed by German Engineers in part of the Berlin-Baghdad Railway project. It was last renovated in 2006.

References 

Bridges in Adana
Landmarks in Adana
Bridges over the Seyhan River
Steel bridges
Bridges completed in 1912
Railway bridges in Turkey
Turkish State Railways
1912 establishments in the Ottoman Empire